Ruysch or Ruijsch is a Dutch patronymic surname, derived from the archaic Dutch given name Ruis. Variant forms are Ruijs, Ruis and Ruisch. People with the surname include:

 Johannes Ruysch (c.1460–1533), Dutch explorer, cartographer, astronomer, manuscript illustrator and painter
 Ruysch Map of the World, his 1507 map, second to show the New World
 Frederik Ruysch (1638—1731), Dutch doctor and anatomist, remembered for his developments in anatomical preservation
 Rachel Ruysch (1664—1750), Dutch artist who specialized in still-life paintings of flowers, daughter of Frederik Ruysch
 Anna Ruysch (1666–1741), Dutch flower painter, daughter of Frederik Ruysch

References

Dutch-language surnames
Patronymic surnames